Concentric is the sixth studio album by the Italian psychedelic rock band Jennifer Gentle, released in 2010 by A Silent Place.

Track list
 
 Key
 Land
 Neon
 Melt
 Hunt
 Scar
 Halos
 Yell

References

2010 albums
Jennifer Gentle albums